Thomas "Tommy" Jackson (August 9, 1931 – February 14, 1982), often known as "Hurricane" Jackson, was an American professional boxer who competed from 1951 to 1961. In July 1957, he fought Floyd Patterson for the heavyweight championship. Jackson was noted for his stamina, bravery, and unorthodox style as a fighter. He was trained and managed by Whitey Bimstein.

Jackson, who was said to implore a "wild, windmill attack" was known to throw a double uppercut, in which he held both hands together as he brought them up.

While Jackson never won the Heavyweight title, he defeated some notable heavyweights, including tough contender Bob Baker and former champion Ezzard Charles, whom Jackson beat twice in 1955. In February 1956, he was ranked behind Light Heavyweight champion Archie Moore as a contender for Rocky Marciano's heavyweight title.

He fought two bouts with Floyd Patterson. In June 1956 he and Patterson fought in an elimination fight to see who would fight for the heavyweight championship left vacant by Rocky Marciano's retirement. Jackson lost a twelve-round split decision. In July 1957 Jackson fought Patterson again, this time for the heavyweight championship held by Patterson. Jackson lost in the tenth round by technical knockout. He fought on with limited success and had his final bout in 1960. After a few exhibition bouts in 1961, he retired, permanently leaving the ring.

In his later life he worked shining shoes and as a taxi driver. While driving his cab in late 1981 he was hit by a car and was critically injured. He died in 1982 in New York City due to his injuries.

Jackson was famous for bravery in the ring and at times taking much punishment. At one stage his license was suspended to help recovery.

His overall career record was 34 wins (with 16 knockouts), nine losses, and one draw.

Professional boxing record

References

External links
Boxing record
Sport: The Big Wind, TIME, June 7, 1954
Patterson By A Ko..., Sports Illustrated, July 29, 1957
See Me For Dust: The Brief Stardom of Tommy “Hurricane” Jackson

Boxers from Georgia (U.S. state)
1931 births
1982 deaths
People from Sparta, Georgia
Heavyweight boxers
American male boxers
American taxi drivers